QT Canberra is a hotel in Canberra, Australia.

Construction began on the 215 room Lakeside Hotel at 1 London Circuit in 1970. Designed by Peddle, Thorp & Walker, it was built by Mainline Corporation. It opened on 22 November 1972.

The Lakeside Hotel was rebranded as Rydges Lakeside in 1995 having become part of the Rydges Hotels & Resorts chain in 1980. It was branded as QT Canberra in 2014 after becoming part of QT Hotels & Resorts.

References

External links

Buildings and structures in Canberra
Hotels in the Australian Capital Territory
1972 establishments in Australia